Cosmic Interception is the second studio album by Von LMO, released in February 1994 by Variant Records. It comprises tracks recorded in 1979 and the songs "Cosmic Interception" and "Inside Shadowland", which were recorded in 1994 with Otto Von Ruggins.

Track listing

Personnel
Adapted from the Cosmic Interception liner notes.

 Von LMO – lead vocals, electric guitar, musical arrangement, bass programming (1, 4), drum programming (1, 4), percussion (1, 4), production (1, 4), engineering (1, 4), Illustration
Musicians
 Craig Coffin – bass guitar (2, 3, 5-8)
 Mike Cross – electric guitar (2, 3, 5-8)
 Juno Saturn – tenor saxophone (2, 3, 5-8)
 Otto Von Ruggins – keyboards (1, 4), production (1, 4), engineering (1, 4)
 Bobby Ryan – drums (2, 3, 5-8)

Production and additional personnel
 Peter Crowley – production (2, 3, 5-8)
 Ken Lee – mastering
 A. T. Michael MacDonald – assistant engineering (2, 3, 5-8)
 Milton Morales – design
 Paul Wickliffe – engineering (2, 3, 5-8)

Release history

References

External links 
 Cosmic Interception at Bandcamp
 Cosmic Interception at Discogs (list of releases)

1994 albums
Von LMO albums